Elwin is an unincorporated community and census-designated place (CDP) in South Wheatland Township, Macon County, Illinois, United States. It was first listed as a CDP in 2020, with a population of 119.

The name "Elwin" is an amalgamation of the surnames of founders Elwood and Martin.

Geography
Elwin is located in central Macon County at  (39.851636, -88.944228). Centrally located within South Wheatland Township, it was once known as South Wheatland. U.S. Route 51 bypasses Elwin on its east side, with its old alignment passing through the center of the community as U.S. Route 51 Business. The two routes join south of Elwin and lead south  to Pana.

The community is in the Spring Creek watershed, which flows north to the Sangamon River in Decatur.

Demographics

References

Census-designated places in Illinois
Census-designated places in Macon County, Illinois
Unincorporated communities in Illinois
Unincorporated communities in Macon County, Illinois